Benjamin Wynkoop (November 5, 1673 - buried April 6, 1751) was an early American silversmith, active in New York City.

Wynkoop was born in Kingston, New York and baptised  by the Dominie of Kingston's Old Dutch Church on April 18, 1675. On October 21, 1697, he married Femmetje Van Der Huel in New York City, where they lived in the South Ward of Manhattan Island. He was made freeman of the city in 1698 and served as a Collector and Assessor of Taxes at various times from 1703 to 1732. His Spanish-Indian slave, London, was indicted with others in the New York Conspiracy of 1741 for conspiring to burn the city. He died in New York City.

Wynkoop made much of the communion silver of the Dutch Reformed churches. His work is collected in the Metropolitan Museum of Art, Museum of the City of New York, New York Historical Society, Smithsonian Institution, Winterthur Museum, and the Yale University Art Gallery.

References 
 "Benjamin Wynkoop", American Silversmiths.
 The Bulletin of the Metropolitan Museum of Art, Volumes 16–17, Metropolitan Museum of Art, 1921, page 196.
 American Silver of the XVII & XVIII Centuries: A Study Based on the Clearwater Collection, Alphonso Trumpbour Clearwater, Clara Louise Avery, Metropolitan Museum of Art, 1920, page 26.
 Early American Silver in The Metropolitan Museum of Art, Beth Carver Wees, Medill Higgins Harvey, Metropolitan Museum of Art, 2013, page 78.
 American Silversmiths and Their Marks: The Definitive (1948) Edition, Stephen G. C. Ensko, Courier Corporation, 2012.

American people of Dutch descent
American slave owners
American silversmiths
1673 births
1751 deaths